V2: Dead Angel is a 2007 Finnish crime film directed by Aleksi Mäkelä. It is a sequel to the 2004 film Vares: Private Eye and is based on the 1990 novel Jäätynyt enkeli by Reijo Mäki.

Plot
Private detective Jussi Vares investigates the homicide of a young woman that occurred in the city of Pori. It is the second film in the Vares series and the last film to feature Juha Veijonen as Vares.

Cast 
 Juha Veijonen as Jussi Vares
 Hannu-Pekka Björkman as Jakke Tienvieri
 Jussi Lampi as Veikko Hopea
 Johanna Kokko as Mirjami Sinervo
 Lotta Lindroos as Lila Haapala
 Kari-Pekka Toivonen as Taisto Pusenius
 Pekka Huotari as Harry Jalkanen
 Kari Väänänen as Usko Saastamoinen
 Seppo Pääkkönen as Nils Hellman
 Matti Onnismaa as Matti Urjala
 Vesa Vierikko as Aarno Kaitainen
 Tommi Korpela as Tom Marjola
 Jasper Pääkkönen as Dante Hell
 Kari Hietalahti as Kullervo Visuri

References

External links 
 

Finnish crime action films
2000s crime action films
Finnish detective films
Films based on thriller novels
Films directed by Aleksi Mäkelä
Films set in Finland
Films shot in Finland
Films based on Finnish novels
Finnish sequel films
2000s Finnish-language films